James A. Seymour (born April 8, 1939) is the Iowa State Senator from the 28th District. A Republican, he has served in the Iowa Senate since 2003.

Seymour currently serves on several committees in the Iowa Senate - the Appropriations committee; and the Human Resources committee, the State Government committee; and the Veterans Affairs committee, where he is the ranking member.  He also serves as ranking member of the Transportation, Infrastructure, and Capitals Appropriations Subcommittee.

Seymour was last re-elected in 2008 with 17,188 votes, running unopposed.

External links
Senator James Seymour official Iowa Legislature site
Senator James Seymour official Iowa General Assembly site
Senator James Seymour at Iowa Senate Republican Caucus
 

Republican Party Iowa state senators
1939 births
Living people
Politicians from Rockford, Illinois
People from Harrison County, Iowa